Canonbury is a residential area of Islington in the London Borough of Islington, North London. It is roughly in the area between Essex Road, Upper Street and Cross Street and either side of St Paul's Road.

In 1253 land in the area was granted to the Canons of St Bartholomew's Priory, Smithfield, and became known as Canonbury. The area continued predominantly as open land until it was developed as a suburb in the early nineteenth century.

In common with similar inner London areas, it suffered decline when the construction of railways in the 1860s enabled commuting into the city from further afield.  The gentrification of the area from the 1950s included new developments to replace war-damaged properties in Canonbury Park North and South as well as restoration of older buildings.

Geography
Canonbury is traditionally an area of Islington, and has never been an administrative unit in its own right. For this reason it has never had formally defined boundaries, but approximates to the area between Essex Road, Upper Street and Cross Street and either side of St Paul's Road. The Canonbury electoral ward within the London Borough of Islington extends as far east as Southgate Road.

East Canonbury is the south-eastern corner of the district, bordering on the Regents Canal. Parts of this area were transferred to the district from the London Borough of Hackney in a boundary adjustment (along the line of the northern towpath of the canal), in 1993.

A dark red brick, traffic free estate, it was praised as an example of municipal architecture, but acquired a bad reputation and has since been extensively redeveloped to improve security for residents.

Places of interest
Canonbury Tower – The manor house of Canonbury was constructed by William Bolton of St Bartholomew's Priory between 1509 and 1532. At the Dissolution of the Monasteries it was granted to Thomas Cromwell. In the 1590s the manor house was rebuilt by Sir John Spencer, Lord Mayor of the City of London, including the construction of its tower. The tower has been occupied by many historical figures, including the philosopher and Lord Chancellor Francis Bacon, and the Irish novelist and playwright Oliver Goldsmith. The Tower Theatre Company was based here from 1953 to 2003. It is currently used as a Masonic research centre.
Canonbury Square – Developed between 1805 and 1830, it includes a variety of distinct styles. In 1812, when few properties had been built, the New North Road turnpike, now known as Canonbury Road, was constructed and bisects the square. Many significant figures from the arts and literary worlds have lived on the square, including the writers George Orwell and Evelyn Waugh, and the actor  Samuel Phelps.
The Estorick Collection of Modern Italian Art is in Canonbury Square.
John Spencer Square – A residential garden square named after Sir John Spencer, Lord Mayor of the City of London, former residents include Barbara Castle, Labour politician and former Secretary of State, and  English constitutional historian David Starkey.
New River Walk – The New River, an aqueduct built by Sir Hugh Myddelton to supply fresh water to London, was completed in 1613. The walk is in two parts, with a break at Willowbridge.  The southern section received an early National Lottery grant, and has a back-pumping scheme which simulates the water flow of the original aqueduct.
Arlington Square – voted one of the UK's best garden squares.

Literary and artistic connections

George Orwell moved to 27b Canonbury Square in the autumn of 1944 – he and his wife having been bombed out of their previous flat, in Mortimer Crescent, on 28 June 1944. Evelyn Waugh lived at 17a Canonbury Square from 1928 to 1930. Charles Dickens wrote a Christmas story about a lamplighter in Canonbury, which features the Tower. Leslie Forbes, the travel and detective story writer, and amateur historian Gavin Menzies both live in the area.

Churches

St Paul's, at the junction of Essex Road and Balls Pond Road, was designed in 1826-28 by Charles Barry for the Church of England. Its parish was merged with St Jude, Mildmay and since 1997 the building has been used as a Steiner school.
St Stephen's Church, Church of England, is on Canonbury Road and was built in 1839.

Groups in Canonbury

 Greenpeace UKoffices based at Canonbury Villas.
 The Canonbury Society aims to conserve the special character of Canonbury by monitoring development.
 Islington & Stoke Newington (T.S Quail) Sea Cadet Unit
 The Islington Society was founded in 1960 to safeguard and improve the quality of life in Islington. It focuses on the built environment and public transport, but also takes a special interest in public services and open spaces.

Politics
 Canonbury forms part of the Islington South and Finsbury parliamentary constituency. The constituency's MP is Labour politician Emily Thornberry. The Islington councillors representing Canonbury are Alex Diner, Clare Jeapes and Nick Wayne (Labour).

Demography
The 2011 census showed that the population of Canonbury ward was 72% white (53% British, 15% Other, 4% Irish), and 6% Black African.

Transport and locale

Nearest stations
 Angel
 Essex Road
 Canonbury
 Highbury & Islington

Buses

London Buses routes 4, 19, 30, 38, 56, 73, 236, 263, 341, 393 and 476 serve Canonbury.

Education

Canonbury Road School, now Canonbury Primary School,  opened in 1877. It is a Community primary school taking boys and girls from 3 to 11 years of age. In 2010, the school was placed in special measures. By 2013, when Ofsted inspected Canonbury Primary School it was rated as a Good school.  In 2013, there were 460 pupils on the school roll.

Founded as a charity school in 1710, St Mary's Church of England Primary School has, since 1967, been situated on Fowler Road in Canonbury. When Ofsted inspected the school in 2012 it was rated as a Good school and there were 178 pupils on the school roll.

The North Bridge House Senior School & Sixth Form is located in Canonbury.

Notable residents

 Thomas Cromwell, Lord Privy Seal, lived in Canonbury Tower from 1533 until his execution in 1540 by order of King Henry VIII
 Sir Francis Bacon, King James I's Lord Chancellor, lived in Canonbury Tower, 1616-1626
 William Babell, musician, died here in 1723
 Ephraim Chambers, encyclopaedist, lodged at Canonbury Tower
 George Grossmith and Weedon Grossmith, actors and writers, lived at 5 Canonbury Place
 John Newbery, publisher of children's literature, lived in Canonbury House
 Christopher Smart, poet, lived in Canonbury House
 Francis Ronalds, inventor of the electric telegraph, lived at 11 Canonbury Place as a child
 Edmund Ronalds, chemist, was born at 48 Canonbury Square and later lived at the east end of Canonbury Place
 Thomas Field Gibson, Royal Commissioner for the Great Exhibition of 1851, was born at 2 Canonbury Place
 Molly Hughes, educator and author, chronicled her childhood in Canonbury in A London Child of the 1870s growing up in a house that "stood at the corner of two roads" with a view down the length of Grange Grove
 George Orwell, writer, lived at 27b Canonbury Square
 Evelyn Waugh, writer, lived at 17a Canonbury Square
 Duncan Grant and Vanessa Bell, painters and designers, lived at 26a Canonbury Square
 Professor Sir Basil Spence, architect, lived and worked at 1 Canonbury Place from 1956 until his death in 1976. He is commemorated with a blue plaque
 Dame Flora Robson, actress, lived in Alwyn Villas
 Louis Macneice, poet, lived at 52 Canonbury Park South from 1947 to 1952 and is commemorated with a blue plaque
 Barbara Castle, politician, and Ted Castle, journalist, lived in John Spencer Square
 Alan Davies, actor/comedian
 Spider Stacy, founding member of the Pogues
 Harry Randall, music hall and pantomime comedian lived at 4 Canonbury Grove and 2 Alwyne Place
 Cate Blanchett, actress lived at 7 Canonbury Grove
 Chester P, UK hip-hop artist, member of Task Force and M.U.D. Family
 Dame Stella Rimington, head of MI5, lived at 7 Canonbury Grove, in Alwyne Road and in Alwyne Place
 Sir John Mummery PC, DL, a Lord Justice of Appeal
 Sir Nicholas Barrington, ex UK High Commissioner to Pakistan
 William Greaves, co-founder of Capital Kids' Cricket lived at 13 Canonbury Grove
 Charlie Weaver, member and front man of Lonsdale Boys Club
 Sir John Tusa, broadcaster and arts administrator
 Kenneth Griffith, actor, producer, presenter and historian, lived at 8 Alwyne Place, which he named Spion Kop
 Dido (singer) used to live at 1, Willow Bridge Road.
 Keira Knightley and her husband James Righton moved into Canonbury in 2014
 Kit Harington, actor moved into Canonbury in 2015.
 James Bay (singer), moved to Canonbury in 2016.
 Gareth Morris, principal flute, Philharmonia and New Philharmonia Orchestras (1948-1972) also principal flute professor of Royal Academy of Music (1945-1985), resident of 4, Alwyne Place from 1945 to 1987
 Allegra Stratton, Downing Street Press Secretary from 2020 to 2021, and her husband James Forsyth, political editor of The Spectator

References

External links
Canonbury Masonic Research Centre
Tower Theatre Company
BBC WW2 People's War - Joan Windsor's WW2 experiences (including bombing raid on Essex Road)
The Canonbury Society

Districts of the London Borough of Islington
Areas of London